Flor de Caña (Spanish for "sugarcane flower") is a brand of premium rum manufactured and distributed by Compañía Licorera de Nicaragua which is headquartered in Managua, Nicaragua and dates back as far as 1890.

History

Flor de Caña is made by Compañía Licorera de Nicaragua, S.A, (CLNSA) and dates back to 1890. The company originally sought to develop a large sugarcane plantation and built the first distillery in Chichigalpa (about 120 km from Managua) at the base of the San Cristóbal Volcano.

Compañía Licorera de Nicaragua was founded in 1937. It was founded by the great-grandfather of the current president, who moved from Italy to Nicaragua in 1875. After building the distillery, it was not until 1937 that Flor de Caña was formally introduced to the Nicaraguan market, with Flor de Caña Etiqueta Amarilla and Flor de Caña Etiqueta Roja being the first two flavors.

In 1959 it was first exported to Venezuela, Costa Rica and other Central American countries. Between 1963 and 1965 the distillery in Chichigalpa underwent modernization updates. Eight years later a second distillery was constructed in Honduras. During the 1980s, Flor de Caña was stored in large quantities due to the Nicaraguan Revolution. By 1990, Flor de Caña had the largest reserve of aged rum in the world.

The distillery in Chichigalpa was completely modernized in 1996. The company now sponsors the Flor de Caña Open, an event on the PGA Tour Latinoamérica, in addition to international bar-mixing competitions. It also sponsors international fishing tournaments of the International Game Fish Association.

Production
Flor de Caña rum is distilled five times during its production. Each rum is aged in a charred oak barrel having previously been used to mature bourbon whiskey, and is also created to comply with kosher standards. The company's rums are aged for up to 25 years. The contemporary line has five premium rums, two super-premium rums, and three ultra premium rums. In 2013 the company updated its bottle design, that includes examples of the rum's award wins and a volcano, intended to represent the volcanic soil of Nicaragua. The rums are distributed in forty-three countries. The Flor de Caña brand symbol is present on all bottles. The logo depicts medals won by the rum and the San Cristobal Volcano.

Products
Flor de Caña produces both white and dark rums. In 2018 it became fair trade certified through Fair Trade USA.

Ultra Coco 4
Ultra Lite 4
Extra Lite 4
Extra Seco 4
Añejo Oro 4
Añejo Clásico 5
Gran Reserva 7
Blanco Reserva 7
Spresso
Flor de Caña 12
Flor de Caña 18
Flor de Cana 25

Recognition
Flor de Caña is renowned as one of the best rums from Latin America, having won more than 150 international awards since 2000 and has been the most award-winning rum brand during this period. It has captured gold, silver, and bronze medals and has received high recommendations from wine and liquor enthusiasts. In 2017 it was recognized at the International Wine and Spirit Competition as the Global Rum Producer of the Year.

References

External links
Ron Flor de Caña official site
Compañía Licorera de Nicaragua, S.A. official site
Grupo Pellas official site

Rums
Alcoholic drink brands
Nicaraguan brands
Nicaraguan cuisine
Food and drink companies of Nicaragua
Food and drink companies established in 1890
Distilleries
Products introduced in 1890
1890 establishments in Nicaragua